The men's 800 metres event at the 1969 European Indoor Games was held on 8 March in Belgrade.

Medalists

Results

Heats
First 4 from each heat (Q) qualified directly for the final.

Final

References

800 metres at the European Athletics Indoor Championships
800